Iceland participated in the Eurovision Song Contest 2009 with the song "Is It True?" written by Óskar Páll Sveinsson, Tinatin Japaridze and Christopher Neil. The song was performed by Yohanna, which is the artistic name of singer Jóhanna Guðrún Jónsdóttir. The Icelandic entry for the 2009 contest in Moscow, Russia was selected through the national final Söngvakeppni Sjónvarpsins 2009, organised by the Icelandic broadcaster Ríkisútvarpið (RÚV). The selection consisted of four semi-finals and a final, held on 10 January, 17 January, 24 January, 31 January and 14 February 2009, respectively. Four songs competed in each semi-final with the top two as selected by a public televote advancing to the final. In the final, "Is It True?" performed by Yohanna emerged as the winner exclusively through public televoting.

Iceland was drawn to compete in the first semi-final of the Eurovision Song Contest which took place on 12 May 2009. Performing during the show in position 12, "Is It True?" was announced among the 10 qualifying entries of the first semi-final and therefore qualified to compete in the final on 16 May. It was later revealed that the Iceland placed first out of the 18 participating countries in the semi-final with 174 points. In the final, Iceland performed in position 7 and placed second out of the 25 participating countries, scoring 218 points.

Background 

Prior to the 2009 Contest, Iceland had participated in the Eurovision Song Contest twenty-one times since its first entry in 1986. Iceland's best placing in the contest to this point was second, which it achieved in 1999 with the song "All Out of Luck" performed by Selma. Since the introduction of a semi-final to the format of the Eurovision Song Contest in 2004, Iceland has, to this point, only failed to qualify to the final three times.

The Icelandic national broadcaster, Ríkisútvarpið (RÚV), broadcasts the event within Iceland and organises the selection process for the nation's entry. RÚV confirmed their intentions to participate at the 2009 Eurovision Song Contest on 14 September 2008. Since 2006, Iceland has used a national final to select their entry for the Eurovision Song Contest, a method that continued for their 2009 participation.

Before Eurovision

Söngvakeppni Sjónvarpsins 2009 

Söngvakeppni Sjónvarpsins 2009 was the national final format developed by RÚV in order to select Iceland's entry for the Eurovision Song Contest 2009. The five shows in the competition were hosted by Ragnhildur Steinunn Jónsdóttir and Eva María Jónsdóttir and all took place at the RÚV studios in Reykjavík. The semi-finals and final were broadcast on RÚV and online at the broadcaster's official website ruv.is.

Format 
Sixteen songs in total competed in Söngvakeppni Sjónvarpsins 2009 where the winner was determined after four semi-finals and a final. Four songs competed in each semi-final on 10, 17, 24 and 31 January 2009. The top two songs from each semi-final qualified to the final which took place on 14 February 2009. The results of the semi-finals and final were determined by 100% public televoting.

Competing entries 
On 14 September 2008, RÚV opened the submission period for interested songwriters to submit their entries until the deadline on 13 October 2008, which was later extended by one week to 20 October 2008. Songwriters were required to be Icelandic or possess Icelandic citizenship, and had the right to submit up to three entries. At the close of the submission deadline, 217 entries were received. A selection committee was formed in order to select the top fifteen entries, while an additional entry came from the winning composer of the 2008 competition Örlygur Smári, who was invited by RÚV for the competition. RÚV presented the sixteen competing artists and songs on 6, 13, 21 and 28 January 2009 via radio on Rás 2.

Shows

Semi-finals 
The four semi-finals took place on 10, 17, 24 and 31 January 2009. In each semi-final four acts presented their entries, and the top two entries voted upon solely by public televoting proceeded to the final.

Final
The final took place on 14 February 2009 where the eight entries that qualified from the preceding three semi-finals competed. The winner, "Is It True?" performed by Jóhanna Guðrún Jónsdóttir, was determined solely by televoting. In addition to the performances of the competing artists, the show was opened by a medley featuring 2008 Icelandic Eurovision entrant Euroband covering past Eurovision entries which included their song "This Is My Life", while the interval act featured guest performances by 1997 Icelandic Eurovision entrant Páll Óskar.

Promotion 
Yohanna made several appearances across Europe to specifically promote "Is It True?" as the Icelandic Eurovision entry. On 17 April, Yohanna performed during the UKeurovision Preview Party, which was held at the La Scala venue in London, United Kingdom and hosted by Nicki French and Paddy O'Connell. On 18 April, Yohanna performed during the Eurovision Promo Concert, which was held at the Café de Paris venue in Amsterdam, Netherlands and hosted by Marga Bult and Maggie MacNeal.

At Eurovision

According to Eurovision rules, all nations with the exceptions of the host country and the "Big Four" (France, Germany, Spain and the United Kingdom) are required to qualify from one of two semi-finals in order to compete for the final; the top nine songs from each semi-final as determined by televoting progress to the final, and a tenth was determined by back-up juries. The European Broadcasting Union (EBU) split up the competing countries into six different pots based on voting patterns from previous contests, with countries with favourable voting histories put into the same pot. On 30 January 2009, a special allocation draw was held which placed each country into one of the two semi-finals. Iceland was placed into the first semi-final, to be held on 12 May 2009. The running order for the semi-finals was decided through another draw on 16 March 2009 and Iceland was set to perform in position 12, following the entry from Bulgaria and before the entry from Macedonia.

The two semi-finals and the final were broadcast in Iceland on RÚV with commentary by Sigmar Guðmundsson. The Icelandic spokesperson, who announced the Icelandic votes during the final, was Þóra Tómasdóttir.

Semi-final 
Yohanna took part in technical rehearsals on 4 and 7 May, followed by dress rehearsals on 11 and 12 May. This included the jury show on 11 May where the professional juries of each country watched and voted on the competing entries.

The Icelandic performance featured Yohanna in a pale blue dress decorated with dark blue feathers, joined on stage by a guitarist and cellist sitting on a white chair as well as three backing vocalists dressed in dark blue and grey outfits. The LED screens displayed a blue background with clouds and a full moon, which transitioned to a dawning scene at the end of the song. The performance also featured smoke effects and the use of a wind machine. The guitarist and cellist that joined Yohanna were Börkur Birgisson and Hallgrímur Jensson, respectively, while the backing vocalists were: Erna Hrönn Ólafsdóttir, Friðrik Ómar Hjörleifsson and Hera Björk Þórhallsdóttir. Friðrik Ómar Hjörleifsson previously represented Iceland in 2008 as part of Euroband.

At the end of the show, Iceland was announced as having finished in the top 10 and subsequently qualifying for the grand final. It was later revealed that Iceland placed first in the semi-final, receiving a total of 174 points.

Final 
Shortly after the first semi-final, a winners' press conference was held for the ten qualifying countries. As part of this press conference, the qualifying artists took part in a draw to determine the running order for the final. This draw was done in the order the countries appeared in the semi-final running order. Iceland was drawn to perform in position 7, following the entry from Portugal and before the entry from Greece.

Yohanna once again took part in dress rehearsals on 15 and 16 May before the final, including the jury final where the professional juries cast their final votes before the live show. Yohanna performed a repeat of her semi-final performance during the final on 16 May. At the conclusion of the voting, Iceland finished in second place with 218 points.

Voting 
The voting system for 2009 involved each country awarding points from 1-8, 10 and 12, with the points in the final being decided by a combination of 50% national jury and 50% televoting. Each nation's jury consisted of five music industry professionals who are citizens of the country they represent. This jury judged each entry based on: vocal capacity; the stage performance; the song's composition and originality; and the overall impression by the act. In addition, no member of a national jury was permitted to be related in any way to any of the competing acts in such a way that they cannot vote impartially and independently.

Following the release of the full split voting by the EBU after the conclusion of the competition, it was revealed that Iceland had placed fourth with the public televote and second with the jury vote in the final. In the public vote, Iceland scored 173 points, while with the jury vote, Iceland scored 260 points.

Below is a breakdown of points awarded to Armenia and awarded by Iceland in the first semi-final and grand final of the contest. The nation awarded its 12 points to Finland in the semi-final and to Norway in the final of the contest.

Points awarded to Iceland

Points awarded by Iceland

Detailed voting results

References

2009
Countries in the Eurovision Song Contest 2009
Eurovision